Würzburg Cathedral is a Roman Catholic cathedral in Würzburg in Bavaria, Germany, dedicated to Saint Kilian. It is the seat of the Bishop of Würzburg and has served as the burial place for the Prince-Bishops of Würzburg for hundreds of years. With an overall length of 103 metres, it is the fourth largest Romanesque church building in Germany, and a masterpiece of German architecture from the Salian period. Notable later additions include work by Tilman Riemenschneider and Balthasar Neumann. The cathedral was heavily damaged by British bombs in March 1945 but rebuilt post-World War II.

History 

The present cathedral was built from 1040 onwards by Bishop Bruno of Würzburgis. It likely was the third church on the site: the previous two, built in about 787 and 855, were respectively destroyed and severely damaged by fire. After Bruno's accidental death in 1045, his successor Adalbero completed the building in 1075. Due to several rebuildings, notably after 1133, the cathedral was only consecrated in 1187. This church already had the strong cross lay-out still present today: a long nave with a high choir, the broad transept and the two narrow western towers.

After 1237, the originally lower eastern towers were raised, showing features of early Gothic style. 

The side aisles were remodelled in about 1500 in the late Gothic style. The stuccoist Pietro Magno decorated the cathedral in Baroque stucco work in 1701-04.

In 1721-34, Balthasar Neumann built the burial chapel for the Schönborn bishops, north of the transept. Around the foot of the eastern tower, he also added a Baroque vestry and Ornatkammer (1749).

Additional changes made to the western façade and towers in 1879-85 (see picture of the cathedral in 1904) were removed after 1946.

The greater part of the building collapsed in the winter of 1946 in consequence of the fire bombing of Würzburg on 16 March 1945. Reconstruction was completed in 1967, in the course of which the Baroque components were removed in favour of a re-Romanisation. The new interpretation emphasizes the contrast between the surviving historical parts of the structure, resulting in a sometimes controversial combination of predominantly Romanesque with modern and Baroque elements. The Romanesque Revival west front with a rose window, the tripartite gallery and the opening for the clock were combined during the reconstruction with a plain pumice stone wall, and revealed again during renovation work up to November 2006. In 1988 the choir was redesigned by Hubert Elsässer.

The stucco ceiling that had collapsed in 1946 was not rebuilt, but replaced by a flat wooden ceiling.

Description
With a length of 103 metres, the cathedral is reckoned to be the fourth largest Romanesque basilica in Germany.

Works of art 
The cathedral contains numerous works of art, of which the following are of especial note:
 A series of tombs and epitaphs of bishops, including the monumental effigies of the prince-bishops Rudolf II von Scherenberg (1495) and Lorenz von Bibra (1519), both by Tilman Riemenschneider
 Schönborn Chapel by Balthasar Neumann and Maximilian von Welsch with the tombs of Johann Philipp von Schönborn, Lothar Franz von Schönborn, Johann Philipp Franz von Schönborn and Friedrich Karl von Schönborn 
 Double crypt. The eastern part dates from 1040 and contains the tomb of Bruno. The western one (12th century) was demolished around 1700 but rebuilt after 1962. It features an old well, the tomb of Conrad of Querfurt and the oldest piece of art of the cathedral: a bearded face which may be Carolingean or even Merovingian in origin. 
 Burial chapel/Sepulture: Like the chapter hall above, the Gothic structure was destroyed in the bombing raids but has been rebuilt. It now contains a cycle of stained glass by Georg Meistermann.
 Baptismal font (1279), by Meister Eckart of Worms
 Seven-armed candelabra (1981) by Andreas Moritz

Layout of the main level of the building

1. Trellis by Markus Gattinger (1750/52; outermost wings 1967)
2. Gottfried of Spitzberg (d 1190)
3. Bishop Gottfried III von Hohenlohe (d 1322)
4. Bishop Manegold von Neuenburg (d 1303)
5. Bishop Otto II von Wolfskeel (d 1345; by the so-called Wolfskeel Master)
6. Three kings with the Madonna	 
7. Bishop Wolfram von Grumbach (d 1333)
8. Bishop Johann II von Brunn (d 1440)
9. Bishop Albrecht II von Hohenlohe (d 1372)
10. Bishop Gottfried IV Schenk von Limpurg (d 1455)
11. Bishop Rudolf von Scherenberg (d 1495; by Tilman Riemenschneider)
12. Bishop Melchior Zobel von Giebelstadt (d 1558; by Peter Dell the Younger)
13. Bishop Lorenz von Bibra (d 1519; by Tilman Riemenschneider)
14. Bishop Friedrich von Wirsberg (d 1573)
15. Bishop Julius Echter von Mespelbrunn (d 1617; by Nikolaus Lenkhart)
16. Chancel 
17. Bishop Johann Gottfried von Aschhausen (d 1622)
18. Ferdinand von Schlör (d 1924)
19. Choir and apse in stucco relief
20. North transept altar and Provost's Altar (by Pietro Magno 1704)
21. Provost Faust Franz Ludwig von Stromberg (d 1673; by Johann Philipp Preiss)
22. Portal to the sacristy
23. Bishop Gerhard von Schwarzburg (d 1400)
24. Lothar Franz von Schönborn (d 1729)
25. Altar of Mary Magdalene
26. Johann Philipp Franz von Schönborn (d 1724)
27. Fresco of the Resurrection (by Byss)
28. Door to the Schönborn Chapel, with angel (by Curé)
29. Bishop Friedrich Karl von Schönborn-Buchheim (d 1746)
30. Altar of the Pietà
31. Bishop Johann Philipp von Schönborn, also Archbishop of Mainz and Bishop of Worms  (d 1673)
32. Bishop Conrad von Bibra (d 1544; by Peter Dell the Elder)
33. Altar of Our Lady
34. Dean Johann Konrad Kottwitz von Aulenbach (d 1610; by Zacharias Juncker)
35. Crypt entrance and exit
36. Bishop Konrad von Thüngen (d 1540; bronze plate)
37. Bishop Conrad von Bibra (d 1544; bronze plate)
38. Bishop Lorenz von Bibra (d 1519; bronze plate, by Hans Vischer and Peter Vischer the Elder)
39. Erasmus Neustetter known as Stürmer (d 1594; bronze plate)
40. Johann Philipp Fuchs von Dornheim (d 1727; bronze plate)
41. Richard von der Kere (d 1583; bronze plate)
42. Albrecht von Bibra, dean of the cathedral chapter (d 1511; bronze plate)
43. Gg. von Giech (d 1501; bronze plate)
44. Philipp Adolf von Ehrenberg (d 1631; bronze plate)
45. Bishop Franz Ludwig von Erthal (d 1795)
46. Gg. Anton von Stahl (d 1870)
47. Johann Valentin Reissmann (d 1875)
48. Franz Josef von Stein (d 1909)
49. Adam Friedrich Gross von Trockau (d 1840)
50. Georg Karl von Fechenbach (d 1808)
51. Bishop Christoph Franz von Hutten (d 1729)
52. Mural of Saints Felix, Regula and Exuberantius
53. Bishop Adam Friedrich von Seinsheim (d 1779)
54. Peter von Aufsess (d 1522; bronze plate) 
55. Johann von Guttenberg (d 1538; bronze plate) 
56. Erasmus Neustetter known as Stürmer (d 1594; bronze plate)
57. Johann Konrad Kottwitz von Aulenbach (d 1610; bronze plate)
58. Bishop Melchior Zobel von Giebelstadt (d 1558; bronze plate)
59. Bishop Friedrich von Wirsberg (d 1573; bronze plate)
60. Bishop Julius Echter von Mespelbrunn (d 1617; bronze plate)
61. The Death of Mary (sculptural group)
62. Neithart von Thüngen, Bishop of Bamberg and Provost of Würzburg (d 1598; by Hans Juncker)
63. Apostles' Altar (three statues by Tilman Riemenschneider 1502/06)
64. Bishop Konrad II von Thüngen (d 1540; by Loy Hering)
65. Moritz von Hutten (d 1552)
66. Dean's Altar (by Pietro Magno)
67. Georg Heinrich von Stadion (d 1716)
68. Bernhard von Solms (Lich) (d 1553)
69. Doorway to cloister
70. Heinrich Truchsess von Wetzhausen (d 1548)
71. Jakob Baur von Eiseneck (d 1621)
72. Paul Truchsess von Wetzhausen-Unsleben (d 1528)
73. Burial chapel
74. Jakob Fuchs von Wonfurt (d 1558)
75. Heinrich von Seinsheim (d 1360)
76. Ebbo (?) (10th century)
77. Master of the cathedral school (late Gothic)
78. Crucifixion Group (1763)
79. Friedrich von Brandenburg (d 1536)
80. Old cathedral school gate 1565
81. Saint Kilian (1720, by Esterbauer)
82. Wall painting fragments of Christ and Mary, and of Mary and Saint John the Evangelist 
83. Door to the cloister and two late Gothic coats of arms (Scherenberg and Grumbach)
84. Johann von Grumbach (d 1466)
85. Johann von Egloffstein (d 1411)
86. Johann Vitus von Würtzburg (d 1756; bronze plate)
87. Vitus Gottfried von Wernau (d 1649; bronze plate)
88. Sebastian Echter von Mespelbrunn (brother of bishop; d 1575)
89. Martin von der Kere (d 1507; bronze relief), and Konrad Friedrich von Thüngen (d 1629; bronze relief)
90. Pillar of Jachin, 11th century
91. Pillar of Booz, 11th century
92. Bronze baptismal font by Master Eckard of Worms, 1279
93. Pietà (c. 1410)
94. Heraldic fragment of gravestone of Provost Daniel von Stibar (d 1555)
95. Gravestone of Johann Philipp Echter von Mespelbrunn (d 1665)
96. Fragment of gravestone of Lorenz Truchsess von Pommersfelden (d 1543)
97. Dean Franz Christ. von Rosenbach (d 1687; by Sebastian Betz)
98. Johann Philipp Ludwig Ignaz von Franckenstein (d 1780; by Franz Martin Mutschele)
99. Saint John the Evangelist (by Tilman Riemenschneider)
100. Coat-of-arms of the Elector Johann Philipp von Schönborn (d 1673)
101. Grave of Tilman Riemenschneider (copy of original tombstone)

Organs 
The main organ was built in 1969 by the organ builders Klais. There is a second organ for the choir, and a third is planned for 2010.

Bells 
The cathedral today has 20 bells, with a total combined weight of 26 tons. 

The largest is the Salvator Bell with a diameter of 2.3 m and weighing in at 10 tons. Of the old bells only the Lobdeburg Bell, by Cunradus Citewar of Würzburg, the most prominent bellfounder of his time, dates from 1257. Because it was taken down in 1933 and stored in the crypt, it is the only ancient bell of the cathedral to have survived the firestorm caused by the bombing of 16 March 1945. It now hangs in the south-west tower and is rung every Friday at 3:00 p.m., to mark the hour of the death of Jesus Christ. 

All the other bells melted and the liquid metal ran down into the basement of the towers, where the stored cathedral treasure was destroyed.

Würzburg Synod 

Between 1971 and 1975 the Würzburg Synod convened in the cathedral at the wish of Cardinal Döpfner, to determine the application of the Second Vatican Council to Germany.

Images

References

 Kuhn, Rudolf, 1968: Großer Führer durch Würzburgs Dom und Neumünster: mit Neumünster-Kreuzgang und Walthergrab
 Der Dom zu Würzburg (English Edition) Schnell, Art Guide No 232 (of 1982); Second English edition 1991, Verlag Schnell & Steiner GMBH, Munich and Zurich

External links 

 Official Website 
 Music in Würzburg Cathedral 
 Würzburg Diocesan website: information on the cathedral bells 

Roman Catholic cathedrals in Bavaria
Cathedral
Romanesque architecture in Germany
W